Central Heating 2 (also known as Central Heating Vol. 2) is the fourth compilation from Grand Central Records. The two disc album was originally released on 17 April 2000 and re-released with alternative sleeve art on 12 January 2004.

Disc one
 "Fame" - Gripper
 "Crazy Rhymin'" (featuring Kriminul) - Only Child
 "Distant Invitation" (featuring Siron) - Rae & Christian
 "Breakneck" - Only Child
 "Communicated" - Riton
 "Jazz Cop" - Gripper
 "Wait Until Spring" - Aim
 "Break It Down" - Loudicrus
 "Kitten" (featuring Jane Weaver) - Andy Votel
 "Anything You Want" (featuring QNC) (Aim remix) - Rae & Christian

Disc two
 "Drop A Jewel" (featuring Afu Ra) - Funky Fresh Few
 "Atomic Drop" - Fingathing
 "The Jersey Devil" - Tony D
 "The Squirrel" - Mr. Scruff & Mark Rae
 "Bring It On" - Dual Control
 "Fine" - Kate Rogers
 "Welbury Way" - Tony D
 "Following The Noughties" - J-Walk
 "Banger" - Funky Fresh Few
 "Should Have Known" (featuring Lisa Shaw) - Rae & Christian

See also
 Grand Central Records compilations

2004 compilation albums
Grand Central Records compilation albums
Hip hop compilation albums
Electronica compilation albums